ThreadWeaver is a system library initially developed for KDE Software Compilation 4 and later refactored for KDE Frameworks 5.

ThreadWeaver allows developers to easily take advantage of multi-core processors and multithreading. In ThreadWeaver the workload is divided into individual jobs, then relationship between jobs (what order they should be completed or which has a higher priority); from that ThreadWeaver will work out the most efficient way to execute them. Krita has implemented visual filter previews using ThreadWeaver to prevent GUI lockups.

References

Further reading 

Application programming interfaces
Free computer libraries
KDE Frameworks
KDE Platform